The 1st constituency of the Hauts-de-Seine is a French legislative constituency in the Hauts-de-Seine département. It is represented in the XVIth legislature by Elsa Faucillon of the PCF.

Description

Hauts-de-Seine's 1st constituency was created in 1967 at the same time as the department itself which had previously been part of the department of Seine. The seat includes the north of Colombes and the neighbouring suburb of Gennevilliers it also contains a vast the port and industrial complex on the south bank of the Seine river.

The constituency had been a strong hold of the French Communist Party for its entire existence; this changed at the 2012 election when the incumbent communist Roland Muzeau came second in the first round and withdrew rather than stand against the Socialist Party candidate. However, the constituency came back to its historical political position in 2017: the communist candidate, Elsa Faucillon, was elected against a candidate from the party of the president, Emmanuel Macron, while the incumbent was eliminated from the 1st round with only 9% of the votes.

Historic Representation

Election results

2022

 
 
 
 
 
 
 
|-
| colspan="8" bgcolor="#E9E9E9"|
|-

2017

 
 
 
 
 
 
 
 
|-
| colspan="8" bgcolor="#E9E9E9"|
|-

2012

 
 
 
 
 
 
|-
| colspan="8" bgcolor="#E9E9E9"|
|-
 
 

 
 
 
 

* Withdrew before the 2nd round

2007

 
 
 
 
 
 
|-
| colspan="8" bgcolor="#E9E9E9"|
|-

2002

 
 
 
 
 
 
 
|-
| colspan="8" bgcolor="#E9E9E9"|
|-

1997

 
 
 
 
 
 
|-
| colspan="8" bgcolor="#E9E9E9"|
|-

Sources

 Official results of French elections from 1998: 

1